John Robert Gilbert [Jackrabbit ] (September 4, 1875 – July 7, 1941) was a backup outfielder in Major League Baseball who played between  and  for the Washington Senators (1898), New York Giants (1898) and Pittsburgh Pirates (1904). He was born in Rhinecliff, New York. Batting side and throwing arm are unknown.
 
In a two-season career, Gilbert was a .240 hitter (23-for-96) with 13 runs and four RBI in 28 games, including five stolen bases and a .354 on-base percentage.

Gilbert died in Albany, New York at the age of 65.

External links

Retrosheet

New York Giants (NL) players
Pittsburgh Pirates players
Washington Senators (1891–1899) players
19th-century baseball players
Major League Baseball outfielders
Baseball players from New York (state)
1875 births
1941 deaths
Johnstown Buckskins players
Albany Senators players
Lewiston (minor league baseball) players
Nashua Rainmakers players
Newport Colts players
Auburn Maroons players
Scranton Miners players
Youngstown Little Giants players
Marion Glass Blowers players
Little Rock Travelers players
Toledo Mud Hens players
Kansas City Blues (baseball) players
Nashville Vols players
Wilkes-Barre Barons (baseball) players
Binghamton Bingoes players
Burials in Saratoga County, New York